The Oshan Cosmos is a MPV manufactured by Changan Automobile under the Oshan or Ossan brand in China.

Overview

Originally revealed in June 2018, the Cosmos officially debuted during the 2018 Guangzhou Auto Show.
The Cosmos MPV is powered by a 1.5 liter turbo engine producing 154 hp.

References

External links 
Official website  

Oshan Cosmos
Minivans
Cars of China
Front-wheel-drive vehicles
Cars introduced in 2018